Rocafort is a municipality in the comarca of Horta Nord in the Valencian Community, Spain.

Rocafort is served by Rocafort station, on line 1 of the Metrovalencia railway system.

References

Municipalities in the Province of Valencia
Horta Nord